Richard Glenn Northcutt (born 1941) is an American neuroscientist known for his work in comparative vertebrate neurobiology and evolutionary neuroscience.  He serves on the editorial boards of the Journal of Comparative Neurology, Journal of Morphology, Visual Neuroscience, and Zoologische Reike, and was editor in chief of Brain, Behavior and Evolution.

References

External links
Glenn Northcutt's profile at the University of California, San Diego

Living people
Evolutionary biologists
Academic journal editors
American neuroscientists
21st-century American biologists
University of California, San Diego faculty
Millikin University alumni
University of Illinois alumni
1941 births